The Imola 200 (also known as the 200 Miglia) is a  motorcycle race held annually at Imola.  The race originally ran as a modern motorcycle race from 1972 to 1985.  In 2010, the Imola 200 Miglia Revival began as a classic bike race.

Background
In response to the popularity of the Daytona 200, it was decided to create a "European Daytona" with the best riders from the Grands Prix, European, American and Italian championships competing together.

Inaugural race
The inaugural race was held in 1972, being won by Paul Smart.  He was riding a Ducati 750 Imola Desmo.  This bike is considered the first V-twin engine with desmodromic valve system for Ducati.

Influence
This race was considered a major step in the notoriety of Ducati.

Imola 200 race results
Source:

References

Motorsport competitions in Italy
Imola
Recurring sporting events established in 1972
1972 establishments in Italy